Murphydoris is a monotypic genus of sea slugs, specifically dorid nudibranchs, marine gastropod molluscs in the family Goniodorididae.

Genus description 
Murphydoris singaporensis Sigurdsson, 1991 is the type species of the monotypic genus Murphydoris. The generic name Murphydoris was created to honor the zoologist and ecologist D. H. Murphy, who is on the staff at the National University of Singapore.

The characteristics of the genus Murphydoris is, that it lacks peri-anal ctenidia (comb-like respiratory gills); its rhinophores are non-lamellate and its radula formula is n x 1.1.0.1.1. The lateral teeth are unicuspid (= with a single tapering point) with 12 denticles and the marginal teeth are bicuspid.

Distribution 
The type locality for Murphydoris singaporensis is mangroves between Kranji and Sungei Buloh Wetland Reserve in Singapore.

Species description 
Murphydoris singaporensis was firstly collected by Jon B. Sigurdsson, and was described as a new species in 1991.

This is a small nudibranch with a body length of 5 mm and a body width of 2 mm. It was found along the coast of Singapore, between colonies of the bryozoan Sundanella sibogae (order Ctenostomatida).

In this animal, the mantle is colorless and translucent, showing the colors of the internal organs. The surface of the mantle shows irregular dark reddish-brown blotches. Behind the rhinophores there is a large horse shoe shaped spot. There are no mantle papillae in front of the non-lamellate, non-retractile rhinophores. The mantle ridge is situated at either side of the anus and is reduced to three pairs of bifid tentacles. Its penis is armed with many spines. It lays its spawn in loose white coils.

When these nudibranchs respond to a threat, they adopt a defensive posture: they flatten their body allowing numerous spicules to penetrate through the body wall, so that the nudibranch assumes the aspect of a hedgehog, covered in spines. The numerous glands on the body wall also probably contribute to the effectiveness of this defensive posture.

Species 
 Murphydoris adusta Paz-Sedano, Smirnoff, Candás, Gosliner & Pola, 2022
 Murphydoris cobbi Paz-Sedano, Smirnoff, Candás, Gosliner & Pola, 2022
 Murphydoris maracabranchia Paz-Sedano, Smirnoff, Candás, Gosliner & Pola, 2022
 Murphydoris puncticulata Paz-Sedano, Smirnoff, Candás, Gosliner & Pola, 2022
 Murphydoris singaporensis Sigurdsson, 1991

Other species have been tentatively placed in Murphydoris, but have not yet been named and are undescribed species:

 Murphydoris sp. 1 Marshall & Willan, 1999 - this is a small species (about 0.5 cm long) living amongst algae along the coast of New South Wales, Australia. Its color is yellow-white with black spots and orange ridges. The rhinophores and gills have the same color but have white tips.
 Murphydoris sp. “GBR Murphydoris” Coleman, 2001
 Murphydoris sp. 1 Cobb & Willan, 2006
 Murphydoris sp. “Black’s Murphydoris” Coleman, 2008
 Murphydoris sp. 1 Debelius & Kuiter, 2007

References

External links 
Photo of Murphydoris sp. 1
 Paz-Sedano, S., Smirnoff, D., Candás, M., Gosliner, T.M. & Pola, M. (2022). Rediscovering the overlooked genus Murphydoris (Nudibranchia: Goniodorididae): the first phylogeny and addition of four new species. Zoological Journal of the Linnean Society. DOI: 10.1093/zoolinnean/zlab122.

Goniodorididae